The Manitoba Open is a golf tournament on PGA Tour Canada that is held in Manitoba, Canada. It was first played from 1919 to 1925 and then from 1931 to 1997 before adopting a new name in 1998. After several further name changes, the tournament readopted its original title for 2020.

From 1998 to 2006 it was known as the MTS Classic, then as the Free Press Manitoba Classic in 2007, and from 2008 to 2012 as the Canadian Tour Players Cup, which was shortened to Players Cup in 2013.

Winners

Sources:

References

External links

Coverage on PGA Tour Canada's official site
Golf tournaments in Canada
PGA Tour Canada events
Recurring sporting events established in 1919
1919 establishments in Manitoba